Stanisław Wołodko (20 March 1950 – 4 February 2021) was a Polish athlete. He competed in the men's discus throw at the 1976 Summer Olympics.

References

External links
 

1950 births
2021 deaths
Athletes (track and field) at the 1976 Summer Olympics
Polish male discus throwers
Olympic athletes of Poland
Sportspeople from Vilnius
Lithuanian Soviet Socialist Republic people
Soviet emigrants to Poland
Zawisza Bydgoszcz athletes